There are three distinct types of  school districts in the U.S. state of Michigan.

 For local education agency (LEA), or public schools districts, see List of local education agency districts in Michigan
 For intermediate school districts (ISDs), see list of intermediate school districts in Michigan
 For public school academy (PSA) districts, which include charter schools, see list of public school academy districts in Michigan

See also
List of high schools in Michigan
List of schools in the Roman Catholic Archdiocese of Detroit

External links
 Public Data Sets,(only accessible from within the US) Educational Entity Master (EEM), Center for Educational Performance and Information (CEPI), State of Michigan

  
Michigan
School districts in Michigan